The Sea Serpent: The Yarns of Jean Marie Cabidoulin (lit. The Stories of Jean-Marie Cabidoulin) is an adventure novel by French author Jules Verne first published in 1901. The story centers on a French whaling ship, the St. Enoch, which sets out from Le Havre on a voyage to kill whales for their meat and oil. The ship's cooper is the eponymous Cabidoulin, a firm believer in the existence of a giant serpent with a habit of dragging vessels to their doom.

Publication history
1967, UK, London, Arco, 191 pp., 60 illus., First English translation

External links

 Les Histoires de Jean-Marie Cabidoulin available at Jules Verne Collection 

1901 French novels
Novels by Jules Verne
Nautical novels